Eremophila fraseri, commonly known as burra or jilarnu, is a flowering plant in the figwort family, Scrophulariaceae and is endemic to Western Australia. It is a shrub or small tree with all above-ground parts of the plant, apart from the petals, sticky and shiny due to the presence of a large amount of resin. The petals are coloured white, cream, pink and brown.

Description
The branches, leaves, sepals and flower stalks are glabrous and thickly covered with resin making them very sticky and shiny. The leaves vary in size and shape, depending on subspecies, from lance-shaped to egg-shaped.

There are 5 reddish-purple sepals which differ from each other in size and shape. The petal tube is brown and the petal lobes on its end are whitish to pale lilac often spotted brown or purple. The inside and outside of the petal tube are hairy, especially the inside of the tube and the petal lobes on the sides are bent back over the petal tube. The 4 stamens extend beyond the end of the petal tube.

Taxonomy and naming 
The species was first formally described in 1881 by Ferdinand von Mueller and the description was published in Fragmenta phytographiae Australiae. The specific epithet (fraseri) honours Sir Malcolm Fraser, the Surveyor-General of Western Australia from 1872 to 1883.

In 2007, Robert Chinnock described two subspecies and the names are accepted by the Australian Plant Census:

Distribution and habitat
Eremophila fraseri subspecies fraseri grows in a wide range of habitats and different soil types between the Hamersley Range and Gascoyne Junction in the Carnarvon, Gascoyne, Murchison, Pilbara and Yalgoo biogeographic regions. Subspecies parva occurs in scattered locations in the Meekatharra and Gascoyne regions where it usually grows in stony or sandy clay loam.

Uses

Indigenous uses
Burra is used as a topical medication, the liquid derived from a preparation of the leaves is used for skin complaints. It is called Jilarnu in the Yindjibarndi and Ngarluma languages and it is collected from a place called Millstream.

Use in horticulture
This is one eremophila that does not make as valuable a garden plant as many others. It tends to become woody and sometimes blackened by sooty mould. It is difficult to propagate except by cuttings and prefers a well-drained soil in full sun or partial shade. It is drought tolerant and can withstand slight frost.

References

fraseri
Eudicots of Western Australia
Plants described in 1878
Endemic flora of Western Australia
Taxa named by Ferdinand von Mueller